Woodcrest is a neighborhood located within Cherry Hill in Camden County, New Jersey, United States. The area dates back to the 1950s and is one of the oldest neighborhoods in Cherry Hill. It was developed by Morris and Harold Sarshik.

Development
Originally a farming community, Woodcrest has a large amount of residential and commercial areas. Residential development began in 1955. Transportation includes several major roads in the area, including County Route 561 (Haddonfield-Berlin Road). Interstate 295 briefly runs through Woodcrest, having an interchange with County Route 561 and another at the Woodcrest Station on the PATCO Speedline.  Woodcrest Country Club is a private golf course located on County Route 544 (Evesham Road). Woodcrest Swim Club is a private swim club that opened in 1957. Woodcrest Elementary School was established the following year.

See also
Ashland, New Jersey, an adjacent neighborhood and census designated place

References

1955 establishments in New Jersey
Populated places established in 1955
Neighborhoods in Cherry Hill, New Jersey